Bulbophyllum drymoda is a species of orchid in the genus Bulbophyllum. It was formerly the type species of the genus Drymoda, now synonymous with Bulbophyllum. It is native to Myanmar, Thailand, and Vietnam.

References

The Bulbophyllum-Checklist
The Internet Orchid Species Photo Encyclopedia

External links 
 
 

drymoda